19th Avenue/Montebello is a station on the Metro light rail line in Phoenix, Arizona, United States. A large park and ride lot is located on the east side of 19th Avenue. The station is immediately south of Bethany Home Road. The station was the northern terminus of the Valley Metro Rail until the Northwest Extension opened in 2016.

Notable places nearby
 Christown Spectrum Mall
 Abrazo Central Campus

Ridership

References

External links
 Valley Metro map

Valley Metro Rail stations in Phoenix, Arizona
Railway stations in the United States opened in 2008
2008 establishments in Arizona